Don Hahnfeldt (April 29, 1944 – December 24, 2017) was an American politician.

Formative years
Hahnfeldt was born in Pittsburgh, Pennsylvania. He received his bachelor's degree from Roosevelt University and his master's degrees from Naval Postgraduate School and from Valdosta State University. Hahnfeldt then served in the United States Navy and became a submarine captain.

Public service 
Hahnfeldt lived in The Villages, Florida. After serving on the Sumter County Board of Commissioners from 2012 until 2016, he then served as the Republican member of the Florida House of Representatives for District 33, which includes Sumter County and parts of Lake County and Marion County, Florida.

Death
Hahnfeldt died from cancer at the age of seventy-three.

References

1944 births
2017 deaths
Politicians from Pittsburgh
Military personnel from Pittsburgh
People from The Villages, Florida
Roosevelt University alumni
Naval Postgraduate School alumni
Valdosta State University alumni
County commissioners in Florida
Republican Party members of the Florida House of Representatives
Deaths from cancer in Florida